Philip Coppens (October 24, 1930 – June 21, 2017) was a Dutch-born American chemist and crystallographer known for his work on charge density analysis using X-rays crystallography and the pioneering work in the field of photocrystallography.

Education and career
The Amersfoort-born Coppens received his B.S. and Ph.D. degrees from the University of Amsterdam in 1954 and 1960, where he was supervised by Carolina MacGillavry. In 1968, following appointments at the Weizmann Institute and Brookhaven National Laboratory, he was appointed in the chemistry department at the State University of New York at Buffalo. He was a SUNY Distinguished Professor and holder of the Henry M. Woodburn Chair of Chemistry. Among the many 3-dimensional structures Coppens characterized is the nitroprusside ion.

Honours and awards
Coppens was a corresponding member of the Royal Netherlands Academy of Arts and Sciences since 1979 and a fellow of the American Association for the Advancement of Science from 1993. Additionally, he was awarded the Gregori Aminoff Prize of the Royal Swedish Academy of Sciences in 1996, the Ewald Prize of the International Union of Crystallography in 2005, and Kołos Medal in 2013.

Bibliography

References

Further reading
 Report on the Symposium honoring Coppens on the occasion of his retirement.

External links
Official website
Biographical sketch, Yale University

1930 births
2017 deaths
21st-century American chemists
20th-century Dutch chemists
Dutch emigrants to the United States
American crystallographers
Members of the Royal Netherlands Academy of Arts and Sciences
University of Amsterdam alumni
University at Buffalo faculty
People from Amersfoort
Fellows of the American Association for the Advancement of Science
Presidents of the American Crystallographic Association
Photochemists
Solid state chemists